Buyo Department is a department of Nawa Region in Bas-Sassandra District, Ivory Coast. In 2021, its population was 176,568 and its seat is the settlement of Buyo. The sub-prefectures of the department are Buyo and Dapéoua.

History
Buyo Department and Méagui Department were created in 2012 by dividing Soubré Department.

Notes

States and territories established in 2012
2012 establishments in Ivory Coast
Departments of Nawa Region